Jorge Paulo Lemann (born August 26, 1939) is a Brazilian billionaire investment banker and businessman with dual Brazilian and Swiss citizenship.

Early life
In 1939, Lemann was born in Rio de Janeiro to Paul Lemann, a Swiss immigrant who founded the dairy manufacturer, Leco, and Anna Yvette Truebner, a Brazilian of Swiss origin. Lemann attended the American School of Rio de Janeiro.

His father died in a bus accident in 1953, when Lemann was 14.

In 1960, he received a bachelor's degree in economics from Harvard University. According to Lemann's own admission, he did not enjoy his time at Harvard, stating that "My first year at Harvard was horrible. I was only 17 and I missed the beach and the sun a lot. Boston was too cold for me. It was my first time in the USA and I was not used to study or to write; we have to write a lot in Harvard. My grades were the worst possible." After setting off fireworks on the last day of his freshman year, he was reprimanded and considered dropping out, but ultimately decided to stay on.

Lemann always wanted to become an inventor. As a kid he admired Thomas Edison. He built different machines but they usually did not work out. Lemann was also an avid tennis amateur. He won the Brazilian national tennis championship five times. He participated in the Davis Cup twice, once as part of the Swiss Davis Cup team and once on behalf of the Brazilian team, and also played at Wimbledon in 1962.

Career
From 1961 to 1962, he worked as a trainee at Credit Suisse in Geneva. In 1966, the first company in which Lemann had equity interest, a lending company called Invesco, went bankrupt. Lemann had a 2% equity stake. In 1971, Lemann, Carlos Alberto Sicupira and Marcel Herrmann Telles founded the Brazilian investment banking firm Banco Garantia. Undaunted by a market crash that came only weeks later, Lemann was eventually able to build Garantia into one of the country's most prestigious and innovative investment banks, described in Forbes as "a Brazilian version of Goldman Sachs." Lemann and his partners now help to control AB Inbev as members of its board of directors.

In 1994, he suffered a heart attack at age 54. Following the Asian financial crisis, Banco Garantia was sold to Credit Suisse First Boston in July 1998 for $675m.

From 1990 to 2001, he served as a member of the board of directors of Companhia Cervejaria Brahma. 
Lemann is a director of Endeavor's Brazil office. Endeavor is an international non-profit development organization that finds and supports high-impact entrepreneurs in emerging markets. Later he and his partners, who founded private equity company GP Investimentos, bought control of two Brazilian breweries (Brahma beer and Companhia Antarctica Paulista) that became AmBev. In 2003 AmBev had a pretax profit margin of 35 percent on sales of US$2.7 billion. By 2004, it controlled 65 percent of the Brazilian beer market and almost 80% of Argentina's, with monopoly positions in Paraguay, Uruguay, and Bolivia.

AmBev merged with Interbrew of Belgium in August 2004. The stock of the combined firm, InBev, rose 40 percent during 2005. InBev then announced it would buy the American brewer Anheuser-Busch in 2008 for $46 billion in a highly controversial deal, making it the world's largest brewer, Anheuser-Busch Inbev (abbreviated as AB Inbev) securing Lemann's status as one of the new "Kings" of beer.

Lemann is a board member of Lojas Americanas S.A. and was a former board member of Gillette (where he first worked with Warren Buffett); chairman of the Latin American Advisory Committee of the New York Stock Exchange; founder and board member of Fundação Estudar, which provides scholarships for Brazilian students; and a member of the international advisory board of DaimlerChrysler.

Lemann is a co-founder of Brazilian investment firm 3G Capital, which owns brands such as Burger King, Anheuser-Busch and Heinz. In September 2010, 3G launched a $4 billion bid, at a 45% premium over market, for all the stock of Burger King. "3G was advised in the BK offer by Lazard, JPMorgan Chase, Barclays Capital and the law firm Kirkland & Ellis. 3G already has some experience in burgers and fries, having previously invested in Wendy's." Together with Berkshire Hathaway, 3G Capital acquired the H. J. Heinz Company for $28 billion in 2013. Its new CEO Bernardo Hees is a former manager of Burger King. The same group announced the merger of Kraft Foods with Heinz in March 2015. He was on the board of Kraft Heinz until 2021, when he announced he was leaving to reduce his travel commitments.

Personal life
Lemann married twice and has six children, three with his first wife and three with his second wife Susanna. He usually shares his time between São Paulo, Rapperswil-Jona on Lake Zurich, where his family lives, and St. Louis. 

In 1999, several gunmen attempted to kidnap his children on their way to school. The incident prompted Lemann to relocate permanently to Switzerland. According to a report, "his children still attended school that day and Lemann was only a little late to the office."

Lemann rarely gives interviews or appears publicly, and is little known in the United States. However, according to Bloomberg, in Brazil, Lemann is considered a "business-class hero", "the wiry, white-haired conglomerateur who’s part Buffett, part Sam Walton, part Roger Federer."

References

External links
 Latin America's most important businessmen. Latin Business Chronicle.
 Brazil's Top 50 Businesspeople. Latinvex.
 
 

1939 births
Living people
Businesspeople from Rio de Janeiro (city)
Brazilian people of Swiss descent
Swiss people of Brazilian descent
Brazilian bankers
Businesspeople in brewing
Brazilian male tennis players
Swiss male tennis players
Brazilian billionaires
Swiss billionaires
Harvard Business School alumni
AB InBev people